Asha Bhat (born 5 September 1992) is an Indian actress, model and the winner of the Miss Supranational 2014 pageant. She is the first Indian to win the title. She made her acting debut with 2019 Hindi film Junglee alongside Vidyut Jammwal and then appeared in 2021 Kannada action thriller film Roberrt.

Early life and education
Asha Bhat was born in Bhadravati, an industrial city in the Shimoga district of Indian state of Karnataka on 5 September 1992 to parents Subrahmanya and Shyamala Bhat. Both her parents are medical laboratory technicians and have been serving the Bhadravati city clinical laboratories. She has one elder sister, Dr. Akshatha, who is a paediatrician.

Bhat attended St. Charles School in Bhadravathi and pursued her pre-university education at Alva's Pre-University College in Moodbidri. She enrolled for National Cadet Corps (NCC) while studying at the Alvas College and was selected to participate in the Republic Day Camp. She was a member of NCC delegation from SAARC nations and visited Sri Lanka Military Academy and won all rounder award in the year 2009, awarded by the president of Sri Lanka, Mahinda Rajapaksa.

She graduated with a Bachelor's degree in Electronic engineering from R.V. College of Engineering.

Currently she is based in Mumbai, and apart from being a model and actress, she is also a social activist and runs her own NGO named the Astra Foundation.

Pageantry
In 2014, she participated in Miss Diva pageant organized by The Times Group and was crowned Miss India Supranational 2014, next to Alankrita Sahai who was crowned Miss India Earth 2014 and Noyonita Lodh, the eventual winner of the contest and was crowned Miss India Universe, at the grand finale of the pageant held on 14 October 2014 at Westin Mumbai Garden City in Mumbai. Asha also won three special awards at Miss Diva 2014 namely, Miss Congeniality, Miss Beautiful Smile and Miss Fascinating.

She represented India at Miss Supranational 2014 held in Krynica-Zdrój in Poland and was the winner of the pageant held on 5 December 2014. She also won the special award for "Best in Talent" and 2nd runner up for "Best National Costume" at the pageant. Her national costume was designed by internationally acclaimed fashion designer and beauty pageant mentor Melvyn Noronha. She was crowned by the outgoing titleholder Miss Supranational 2013, Mutya Johanna Datul from Philippines.

During her one-year tenure with Miss Supranational she visited Thailand, Myanmar, Hungary, Mauritius, China and numerous countries around Poland and India.

In May 2015, she travelled to Thailand and judged the grand finale of Miss Grand Thailand. Along with Miss Supranational 2014 first runner up and the winner of Miss Grand Thailand 2014, Parapadsorn Disdamrong she crowned Tharathip Sukdarunpat as Miss Supranational Thailand at the conclusion of the event held on 12 May 2015 at Indoor Stadium Huamark in Bangkok.

Filmography

References

External links

 Miss Supranational Website
 

1992 births
Indian beauty pageant winners
Female models from Karnataka
Beauty pageant contestants from India
People from Shimoga district
Living people
Miss Supranational winners
Actresses in Hindi cinema
Actresses in Kannada cinema
Actresses in Telugu cinema